Conchatalos vaubani is a species of sea snail, a marine gastropod mollusk in the family Muricidae, the murex snails or rock snails.

Description

Distribution
This marine species occurs off New Caledonia.

References

 Houart, R., 1995. - The Trophoninae (Gastropoda: Muricidae) of the New Caledonian region. Mémoires du Muséum national d'Histoire naturelle 167: 459-498

Conchatalos
Gastropods described in 1995